Cathedral of Exaltation of the Holy Cross is a cathedral in the Diocese of Sisak. It is located in the center of Sisak on Ban Jelačić Square.

History 
The church was built in the 18th century and dedicated in 1765. The spire was built in 1760.

After an earthquake in 1909, the old Baroque facade was replaced with a Neoclassical facade, with details in the Art Nouveau style. The interior of the church was renovated too, including the altar. The church was also damaged in 1991, during the Croatian War of Independence.

On 5 December 2009, Pope Benedict XVI established the Diocese of Sisak. As a result, the parish church became a cathedral.

The church was severely damaged in the 2020 Petrinja earthquake.

References

Bibliography

External links
 Katedralna župa Uzvišenja Svetog Križa Sisak 

Cathedral
Catholic Church in Croatia
Roman Catholic churches completed in 1760
Art Nouveau architecture in Croatia
Art Nouveau church buildings
Buildings and structures in Sisak-Moslavina County
Roman Catholic cathedrals in Croatia
Tourist attractions in Sisak-Moslavina County
18th-century Roman Catholic church buildings in Croatia